Columbus's vow was a vow by Christopher Columbus and other members of the crew of the caravel Niña on 14 February 1493, during the return trip of Columbus's first voyage to perform certain acts, including pilgrimages, upon their return to Spain. The vow was taken at Columbus's behest during a severe storm at sea.

History 
Of the three ships on Columbus's first voyage, the flagship, the Santa María, had been shipwrecked in Hispaniola on December 25, 1492, leaving only the Niña and Pinta to make the homeward voyage. 39 men were left behind, the first Spanish colonists in the Americas. Columbus took command of the Niña; Martín Alonso Pinzón retained command of the Pinta.
 On 14 February 1493, in the Atlantic Ocean east of the Azores, they met with a storm that threatened to capsize the two caravels. In the storm, the boats lost contact with one another, and the crew of the Niña feared the worst. At that moment the admiral, Columbus, proposed a series of vows.

Fulfillment of the vows
On March 15, 1493, after having touched down at the Azores and at Lisbon, the Niña arrived on the banks of the Río Tinto in the Spanish province of Huelva. Columbus, the Niño brothers and the rest of the crew from Moguer headed immediately to Moguer, bringing with them some Caribbean natives whom they had taken on their voyage back, and also bringing several parrots. The people of Moguer greeted them happily; Columbus and his crew headed promptly to the Santa Clara Monastery to light a taper and spend the night in vigil, in fulfilment of one of their vows.

Years later, at Columbus's trial in 1513, Juan Rodríguez Cabezudo, a resident of Moguer and a friend of Columbus, who had taken custody of Columbus's son Diego while Columbus was away at sea, described the event:

The same archive contains the remarks of another witness, Martín González:

Commemoration 
This act is remembered annually on March 16 in an event at the Santa Clara Monastery in Moguer, attended by civil and military authorities, the Royal Columbian Society of Huelva (Real Sociedad Colombina Onubense), and the general public.

The event consists of a mass in which a taper is burned as an act of thanksgiving, and later crown of laurel is placed on the Columbus Monument in homage to the Admiral and the sailors of Moguer who took part in the discovery of America. This is then followed by a talk or a cultural event.

See also
 Lugares colombinos

Further reading
In Spanish:
Muro Orejón, Antonio: Crónica historiada del Voto Colombino de D. Cristóbal Colón en el Monasterio de Santa Clara de Moguer. Col. "Montemayor" Archivo Histórico Municipal; Fundación Municipal Cultura, Moguer, 1986.
 González Gómez, Juan Miguel: El Voto Colombino, el Monasterio de Santa Clara y su influjo en Hispanoamérica. Col. "Montemayor" Archivo Histórico Municipal; Fundación Municipal Cultura, Moguer, 1986.
Torres Ramirez, Bibiano: El diario de Colón y el Voto Colombino. Col. "Montemayor" Archivo Histórico Municipal; Fundación Municipal Cultura, Moguer, 1989.
Fernández Vial, Ignacio: Las tres carabelas. Diputación Provincial de Huelva, Huelva, 1998.
Ropero Regidor, Diego. Los lugares colombinos y su entorno. Fundación Ramón Areces, Madrid, 1992.

Notes

Christopher Columbus
Religious oaths
History of the Atlantic Ocean
1493 in Spain